Crosseola cuvieriana is a species of minute sea snail or micromollusc, a marine gastropod mollusc in the family Conradiidae.

Description
The height of the shell attains 3 mm, its diameter 3.4 mm.

Distribution
This marine species is endemic to Cuvier Island, New Zealand.

References

 Powell A. W. B., New Zealand Mollusca, William Collins Publishers Ltd, Auckland, New Zealand 1979 
 New Zealand Mollusca: Crosseola cuvieriana

cuvieriana
Gastropods of New Zealand
Gastropods described in 1919